Asada may refer to:

Asada (surname)
Asada Domain, a Japanese domain of the Edo period, located in Settsu Province
Asada (crater), a crater on the moon named after Goryu Asada

See also
Australian Sports Anti-Doping Authority
Carne asada, grilled beef
Asado